Diane Bilyeu (born February 11, 1935) is a Democratic politician from Pocatello, Idaho. She was Idaho State Senator from District 29 in Pocatello, from 2006 to 2012. She earlier served in the Idaho Senate from 1968 through 1970.

Background
Bilyeu is a former Democratic Idaho State Senator  and the widow of Charles Bilyeu, a longtime professor at Idaho State University in Pocatello.

She announced her retirement February 27, 2012, to enjoy more time with family.

Bilyeu is the author of A Conversation With Shakespeare, a reader's theater script, published by DB Publishing, 2013.

She supported A. J. Balkoff in the 2018 Idaho gubernatorial election primary election for the Idaho Democratic Party.

Education
Diane Bilyeu received her education from the following institution:
BA, Idaho State University, 1968

Family
Diane Bilyeu is widowed with three children named Brigette, Clark, and Valencia.

Legislative committees
Diane Bilyeu has been a member of the following committees:
Finance, Member
Local Government and Taxation, Member
Transportation, Member

Political experience
Diane Bilyeu has had the following political experience:
Senator, Idaho State Senate, 1968–1970, 2006–2012
County Assessor, Bannock County, 1985-2006
Member, Idaho State Board of Education, 1978-1988

References

External links
Idaho Legislature - Senator Diane Bilyeu official government website
Diane Bilyeu official campaign website
Project Vote Smart - Senator Diane Bilyeu (ID) profile
Follow the Money - Diane Bilyeu
2010 2008 2006 campaign contributions

1935 births
Living people
Democratic Party Idaho state senators
Idaho State University alumni
People from Pocatello, Idaho
School board members in Idaho
Women state legislators in Idaho
21st-century American women